Tera Mera Saath Rahe is an Indian television drama series under Shoonya Square Productions. It premiered from 16 August 2021 to 17 June 2022 on Star Bharat and streams digitally on Disney+ Hotstar. This series is a reboot version of the StarPlus series Saath Nibhaana Saathiya under the tagline Jodi Wahi Kahaani Nayi. It stars Giaa Manek, Mohammad Nazim, Rupal Patel, Vandana Vithlani, Sumati Singh and Varun Jain, Radhika Chhabra, Rupesh kataria.

Plot
The story is based in Bhuj, Gujarat. Gopika is a sweet and talented girl who lives with her uncle and aunt. Being an orphan, she was raised by her uncle, but her aunt, Ramila always had issues with her. She treated her as a mere servant and made her do all household chores. Ramila's daughter Aashi is manipulative and wants to marry Saksham Modi for his wealth. Saksham's mother, Mithila is in search for a suitable bride for her son, who can take care of her husband and family matter properly. To find suitable brides, Mithila has hosted a jewelry competition. Aashi and Ramila manipulatively take away Gopika's sketches and register them under their name.

Gopika, who meets Mithila at the temple, visits Modi Mansion to return her belongings, which she left at the temple. Elsewhere, Mithila tests Aashi to determine her worthiness to become Saksham's wife. Meanwhile, a fire breaks out there, trapping Mithila. Gopika saves Mithila's life and in this commotion, leaves her slipper at their house. Mithila thinks that such a girl, who prioritizes others over herself, should become the Modi family's daughter-in-law. She seeks the slipper's owner to fix her alliance with Saksham. Ramila misleads Mithila into believing that the slipper belongs to Aashi. Later Modis finalize Aashi and Saksham's marriage. Elsewhere, Ramila forces Gopika to marry Jignesh, a gully boy. During the wedding ceremonies it is revealed that Mithila isn't Saksham's biological mother. Mithila is infertile. So Mr. Modi married Mithila's younger sister Minal and have 3 children from her Saksham is actually Mithila's step-son and Nephew. Jignesh attacks the Modis in search of Gopika and is arrested. During the commotion, Gopika's bravery leads Mithila to decide to make Gopika, not Aashi, her daughter-in-law, surprising everyone. Soon, Gopika marries Saksham and Aashi marries Chirag. 

After marriage Gopika despite being the elder daughter-in-law always takes orders from younger daughter-in-law Aashi which leads Mithila to doubt her decision of choosing Gopika for Saksham. When Mithila learns the reality through Baa, She ousts Gopika from the Modi Bhavan. However, Baa stops her and requests Mithila to let Gopika stay as a guest till Diwali. Later, Baa learns the truth that Gopika is the jewelry designer and not Aashi. So, she makes a plan to give a turnover to Gopika and naming her as Radhika. Few days later, according to the headlines, Saksham died in the plane crash, but he didn't go to that flight. Later Priya, Saksham's ex-lover comes and creates trouble for Gopika and Mithila. However Gopika struggles and wins over Priya and reunites with Saksham.

Later, it is revealed that Mr. Modi and his wife kept Gopika's mother as a hostage in their house by giving her the wrong pills and making her mentally ill so that the woman doesn't reveal or remember that Saksham's father Mr. Modi had murdered Gopika's father twenty years ago. In the eyes of media, Gopika's mother was a murderer. Gopika learns of this and is heartbroken, she vows to avenge her mother's kidnapping and to find her escaped brother, Munna, who ran away in childhood after getting embarrassed. However, Mr. Modi has a deeper secret which he doesn't wish to reveal to his family members, so it is evident that he is not the murderer either. He is arrested. Munna returns with his family and decides to annoy the Modis for which he somehow manages to get control over their mansion and business, thus the Modis are ousted from their own house. Later, it is revealed that a 8 years old Saksham has killed Gopika's father accidentally while playing with the gun and this is the truth Mr. Modi was hiding. Saksham is arrested. Gopika is heartbroken. However, eventually things are settled correctly, Mr. Modi and Saksham both are bailed out of the prison. Munna forgives the Modis and is united with them.

After that, a strange girl named Keshari is sent to the Modi house. Initially thought to be Saksham and Shradhha's daughter, she is revealed to be the illegitimate daughter of Chirag. Ashi is heartbroken and decides to terminate her marriage with Chirag and leaves the Modi House. Shraddha is adamant to marry Chirag. Aashi decides to divorce Chirag but Meethila gets the issues sorted out; Chirag reveals to Keshari that he is her biological father, not Saksham. The Modis allow Shraddha to stay at their end. The Modi family lives happily ever after.

Cast

Main
Giaa Manek as Gopika Joshi Modi – Subhadra's daughter; Ramila and Anand's adopted daughter; Munna's sister; Ashi and Hiten's cousin; Jignesh's ex-fiancée; Saksham's wife (2021–2022)
Mohammad Nazim as Saksham Modi – Minal and Keshav's elder son; Mithila's elder nephew and step-son; Chirag and Tejal's brother; Ashi's ex-fiancé; Gopika's husband; Priya's ex-husband. (2021–2022)
Rupal Patel as Mithila Modi – Minal's sister; Keshav's first wife; Saksham, Chirag and Tejal's aunt and step-mother. (2021–2022)
Sumati Singh as Ashi Joshi Modi – Ramila and Anand's daughter; Hiten's sister; Munna and Gopika's cousin; Saksham's ex-fiancée; Chirag's wife (2021–2022)
Rajkumar Singh / Varun Jain as Chirag Modi – Minal and Keshav's younger son; Mithila's younger nephew and step-son; Saksham and Tejal's brother; Ashi's husband; Kesari's father. (2021–2022)

Recurring
Vandana Vithlani as Ramila Joshi – Anand's wife; Ashi and Hiten's mother; Gopika's adoptive mother; Modi's rival. (2021–2022)
 Hitesh Sampath as Anand Joshi – Ramila's husband; Ashi and Hiten's father; Gopika's adoptive father. (2021)
 Minal Karpe as Janaki Modi – Keshav's mother; Saksham, Chirag and Tejal's grandmother. (2021)
 Nitin Vakharia as Keshav Modi – Janaki's son; Mithila and Minal's husband; Saksham, Chirag and Tejal's father; Kesari's grandfather. (2021–2022)
 Jyoti Mukherjee as Minal Modi – Mithila's sister; Keshav's second wife; Saksham, Chirag and Tejal's mother; Kesari's grandmother. (2021–2022)
 Pooja Kava as Tejal Modi Joshi – Minal and Keshav's daughter; Mithila's niece and step-daughter; Saksham and Chirag's sister; Vivan's ex-fiancée; Hiten's wife (2021–2022)
 Maharshi Dave as Hiten Joshi – Anand and Ramila's son; Ashi's brother; Munna and Gopika's cousin; Tejal's husband. (2021–2022)
 Hardik Sangani as Jignesh – Gopika's ex-fiancé (2021)
 Sandeep Kumaar as Vivan Joshi – Tejal's ex-fiancé (2021)
 Kavita Vaid as Moti Baa – Mithila and Minal's sister (2021)
 Priyamvada Kant as Priya / Fake Radhika – Saksham's college friend and ex-wife; Gopika and Mithila's rival; Ashi's friend. (2021–2022)
 Akshaya Bhingarde as Subhadra Doshi – Munna and Gopika's mother; Jigar's grandmother (2022)
 Rupesh Kataria as Munna Doshi – Subhadra's son; Gopika's brother; Rajjo's husband; Jigar's father (2022)
 Radhika Chhabra as Rajjo Doshi – Munna's wife; Jigar's mother (2022)
 Hridyansh Shekhawat as Jigar Doshi – Munna and Rajjo's son (2022)
 Hunar Hali as Shraddha – Chirag's ex-girlfriend; Kesari's mother (2022)
 Hetvi Sharma as Kesari Modi – Chirag and Shraddha's daughter (2022)

Production

Development
The production house in May 2021 declared that the third installment of the Saathiya franchise shall be made for Star Bharat, featuring Gia Manek. It was initially thought to be a prequel to the famous show, Saath Nibhaana Saathiya. But, later it was declared that it would be an independent show. While most of the components of the show have been borrowed from Saath Nibhaana Saathiya, few new additions are also seen in the series. Gia Manek and Mohammad Nazim was roped in for the lead role Gopika and Saksham, while Vandana Vithlani, Nitin Vakharia, Raj Kumar and Minal Karpe also joined the cast. Finally, Rupal Patel was also cast as Mithila. Sumati Singh was also roped in to play a prominent role in the show, Aashi. In November 2021 Rajkumar (who essayed the role of Chirag Modi) quit the show since he barely had any screen time and he thought that he had nothing else to explore in his character. He was replaced with Diya Aur Baati Hum fame Varun Jain

The production of the series began in July 2021 and the makers and cast began their journey with a puja and havan on the sets.

Release
The first promo was out on 26 July 2021, featuring leads Gia Manek and Rupal Patel.

References

External links

 Tera Mera Saath Rahe on Disney+ Hotstar

Indian drama television series
Indian television soap operas
Hindi-language television shows
2021 Indian television series debuts
Star Bharat original programming
Television shows set in Gujarat